East Is West may refer to:
 East Is West (1930 film), an American pre-Code crime drama film
 East Is West (1922 film), an American silent drama film